Courtney Turner (born June 17, 1994) is a women's ice hockey player. She played with the Union Dutchwomen ice hockey and amassed 28 career points while with the college program. She was selected first overall in the 2017 CWHL Draft by the Boston Blades, the second straight year that the club held the first pick in the draft.

Playing career

CWHL
Turner was drafted first overall in the 2017 CWHL Draft by the Boston Blades.
 
Turner appeared in 28 games during her inaugural season with the Boston Blades. She debuted on October 14, 2018, on the road versus Les Canadiennes de Montreal. Turner recorded her first career point the following day in the third period of a 5–3 loss against Montreal with an assist on a goal scored by Chelsey Goldberg. On November 25, 2017, Turner scored the first goal of her CWHL career against the Calgary Inferno in a road series at the 18:43 mark of the first period. During the third period, Turner scored her second goal of the game in a 5–2 loss and was recognized as one of the Three Stars of the Game.

Career stats

References

American women's ice hockey forwards
Living people
1994 births
Union Dutchwomen ice hockey players
Boston Blades players
Professional Women's Hockey Players Association players